Abdel Amir Abbud Rahima was Minister of Agriculture in the cabinet appointed by the Interim Iraq Governing Council in September 2003. A Shia Muslim, Rahima hails from the city of Basra and is a member of the National Democratic Party.

References
 

Government ministers of Iraq
Living people
Year of birth missing (living people)
People from Basra
National Democratic Party (Iraq) politicians